The Châtel-St-Denis–Palézieux railway (CP) was opened in 1901, a metre gauge railway running between the places in its title — Châtel-St-Denis and Palézieux-Gare. At Chatel-St-Denis it formed an end-on junction with the Châtel-St-Denis-Bulle-Montbovon line of the Chemins de fer électriques de la Gruyère, at that time still under construction, opened to Vuadens in 1903 and by 1904 completed through to Montbovon. In that same year also a line to Vevey by the Chemins de fer électriques Veveysans opened.

On 20 December 1907, after an independent existence of just six years, CP amalgamated with its neighbour Chemins de fer électriques de la Gruyère.

Sources 
Grandguillaume Michel, et al., Voies étroites de Veveyse et de Gruyère. BVA, Lausanne, 1984, 

Metre gauge railways in Switzerland
Defunct railway companies of Switzerland
Railway lines in Switzerland